Solanum parishii is a species of nightshade known by the common name Parish's nightshade. It is native to western North America from Oregon to Baja California, where it grows in many types of habitat, including maritime and inland chaparral, woodlands, and forests. It is a perennial herb or subshrub producing a branching, ribbed or ridged stem up to about a meter in maximum height. The lance-shaped to nearly oval leaves are up to 7 centimeters long and smooth-edged or somewhat wavy. The inflorescence is an umbel-shaped array of several flowers, each borne on a short pedicel. The flower corolla is around 2 centimeters wide when fully open and is usually purple, but sometimes white. At the center are yellow anthers. The fruit is a berry roughly a centimeter wide.

References

External links
Jepson Manual Treatment
Photo gallery

parishii
Flora of Baja California
Flora of California
Flora of Oregon
Plants described in 1906
Flora without expected TNC conservation status